The Perfect Woman is a 1920 American silent comedy film directed by David Kirkland and starring Constance Talmadge, Charles Meredith, and Elizabeth Garrison. It was preserved by the Academy Film Archive in 2017.

Cast
 Constance Talmadge as Mary Blake 
 Charles Meredith as James Stanhope 
 Elizabeth Garrison as Mrs. Stanhope 
 Joseph Burke as J.J. Simmons 
 Ned Sparks as Grimes, the Anarchist

References

Bibliography
 Donald W. McCaffrey & Christopher P. Jacobs. Guide to the Silent Years of American Cinema. Greenwood Publishing, 1999.

External links

1920 films
1920 comedy films
Silent American comedy films
Films directed by David Kirkland
American silent feature films
1920s English-language films
American black-and-white films
First National Pictures films
1920s American films